Alagie Barrow is a Gambian-American soldier and human rights investigator. He served as an officer in the United States Army National Guard from 2001 to 2014 before resigning from and going back to The Gambia, his country of birth. Frustrated and pained by the gross human rights abuses in The Gambia, he would join other Gambian dissidents and soldiers in attempting to overthrow the dictator, Yahya Jammeh, the President of the Gambia, who became president through a coup. Barrow would be charged by the US Government for his role in the coup attempt 2014 Gambian coup d'etat attempt, for which he was sentenced to six months imprisonment in the United States under the Neutrality Act 1794 after he voluntarily turned himself in and refused to cooperate with the American Justice Department calling it a farce. He would go back to Gambia and work as consultant for a few months before being appointed as Director of research and investigations for the Gambian Truth, Reconciliation and Reparation Commission in 2018. The Commission was set up to look into the human rights abuses of the past twenty-two years.

Early life and education 
Barrow was born in Kaif, in the Lower River Region, but was raised in Serekunda, the largest town in The Gambia.  He attended high school in Basseand graduated from Nasir Ahmadiya Muslim High School 1992. He moved to Tennessee, United States in 1994. He graduated from Tennessee State University with a major in criminal justice and a minor in psychology. He then graduated from the American Military University in West Virginia with a master's degree in national security studies.

Military service 
Barrow joined the Tennessee Army National Guard in 2001 and was commissioned as an officer in 2008. He was mobilised for deployment in 2003 during the Iraq War, but his unit never ended up deploying. During his time in the National Guard he served as a suicide prevention officer, an illicit drugs prevention officer, a public affairs officer, and a career counselor. In January 2014, he left the military, established an investigations company while also working with REGAL-BELOIT as an account manager.

Barrow also worked as an investigator and security consultant in the private sector in the United States, as a juvenile  justice advocate with the Nashville Juvenile Justice Center, and as an instructor at Vanderbilt University Reserve Officers' Training Corps (ROTC).

2014 coup d'etat attempt 
Frustrated by the human rights violations in his country of birth, Barrow joined a group of individuals and Gambian soldiers to help restore sanity back in his home country which was in a dictatorship of the worst kind. He would play a key role in the 2014 Gambian coup d'état attempt. He purchased at least eight weapons prior to the coup attempt, including three Smith & Wesson rifles from a gun shop near where he lived. In late October 2014, he left his job, flew to Dakar and traveled to The Gambia where he would set the plans for the attack on the dictatorship in motion. While in Dakar, the Federal Bureau of Investigation (FBI) had called Barrow's phone to ask him where he was, but he refused to answer. Barrow would lay the foundations for the attack and subsequently hand over everything to the Gambian soldiers who were leading the operation. When the group attacked the State House on 30 December, Barrow was assigned other functions and was with Gambian soldiers elsewhere on a different mission.. Learning of the failure of the coup attempt, Barrow and the two others left the Gambia and returned to Senegal. Barrow chose to turn himself in to the US authorities who would charge him with  the Neutrality Act of 1794, to which he pleaded guilty. He was sentenced to six months. Barrow refused to cooperate with the US Government and called the charges hypocritical given that he committed no crime in the USA and that White Americans were going all over the world to fight for causes they believe in while he went to his home country to free his people from a dictatorship.

Truth, Reconciliation and Reparation Commission 
Barrow left the United States and returned to The Gambia after Yahya Jammeh was forced out by a military intervention in 2017. In August 2018, Barrow was appointed as the Director of Research and Investigations at the Truth, Reconciliation and Reparations Commission by its executive secretary, Baba Galleh Jallow. Some objected to his appointment on the grounds that a convicted felon should not hold the role. But Barrow was never convicted of any crime in The Gambia and most people in The Gambia regard him as a hero who put all on the line to free his people from the clutches of a tyrant. Barrow would go on to garner much praise for the work he did at the commission before he resigned in December of 2019 to pursue other interests.

References 

Living people
Tennessee State University alumni
Tennessee National Guard personnel
People from Upper River Division
Gambian expatriates in the United States
Year of birth missing (living people)